The 3rd constituency of Loire-Atlantique is a French legislative constituency in the Loire-Atlantique département. Like the other 576 French constituencies, it elects one MP using the two-round system, with a run-off if no candidate receives over 50% of the vote in the first round.

Description

Its representative from 1988 to 2016 was Jean-Marc Ayrault, the former Prime Minister of France (2012–2014). His return to the government prompted a by-election which was won by Karine Daniel. It includes part of the city of Nantes.

Historic representation 

Table Notes

Election results

2022

 
 
 
 
 
 
 
|-
| colspan="8" bgcolor="#E9E9E9"|
|-

2017

2016 by-election
Following the return of Jean-Marc Ayrault to the government and the death of his substitute Jean-Pierre Fougerat, a by-election was held on the Sundays 17 and 24 April 2016.

2012

2007

 
 
 
 
 
 
|-
| colspan="8" bgcolor="#E9E9E9"|
|-

2002

 
 
 
 
 
 
|-
| colspan="8" bgcolor="#E9E9E9"|
|-

1997

 
 
 
 
 
 
 
|-
| colspan="8" bgcolor="#E9E9E9"|
|-

References & Sources
 Official results of French elections from 1998: 

3